Starred student دانشجوی ستاره دار is a common name for a list of Iranian higher education students who are charged with a religious or political conviction. These students are registered in university under specific circumstance or not at all as punishment. Student Affairs Organization  and Ministry of Science and Research denied existence of such lists.

Sources

External links 
msrt.ir

Political repression in Iran